Justin Walker  is an American actor best known for his portrayal of Christian Stovitz in the 1995 comedy film Clueless.

He is a graduate of Washington and Lee University in Lexington, Virginia, having majored in theater.

Walker owned Teddy Teadle's Grill in Rancho Mirage, California. He was Partner & CMO in Draftster.com, a now-defunct fantasy sport wagering website.

Filmography

Other work
 1998 - Pizza Hut "Edge Pizza" Commercial

References

External links
 

American male film actors
Living people
Year of birth missing (living people)
Washington and Lee University alumni